Petar Petrović (born 2 October 1951) is a politician in Serbia. He has served in the National Assembly of Serbia for most of the time since 2001, originally as a member of the Party of Serbian Unity (Stranka srpskog jedinstva, SSJ) and later with United Serbia (Jedinstvena Srbija, JS). He is currently the vice-president of the latter party. Petrović also served in the Assembly of Serbia and Montenegro from 2003 to 2004.

Early life and career
Petrović was born in the village of Loćika in the municipality of Rekovac, in what was then the People's Republic of Serbia in the Federal People's Republic of Yugoslavia. He graduated from the University of Kragujevac Faculty of Law and subsequently moved to Jagodina, where he was director of the Jagodina Construction Directorate.

Political career
Petrović became politically active with the League of Communists of Serbia, which was reconstituted as the Socialist Party of Serbia in 1990. He left the latter party in 1993 and, on the advice of fellow Jagodina resident and political ally Dragan Marković, joined the Party of Serbian Unity, led by the notorious paramilitary leader Arkan (Željko Ražnatović).

Jagodina was the only electoral division in which the SSJ fielded candidates in the 1997 Serbian parliamentary election. Petrović appeared in the second position on the party's electoral list, following Marković; the party did not cross the electoral threshold to win any mandates. Following Arkan's assassination in 2000, Borislav Pelević became the party's leader.

Member of the National Assembly

Party of Serbian Unity
Serbia's electoral map was redrawn for the 2000 parliamentary election, with the entire country becoming a single electoral district. Petrović received the fourth position on a coalition list led by the SSJ; the list won fourteen mandates, and he was subsequently chosen for its assembly delegation. (From 2000 to 2011, parliamentary mandates in Serbia were awarded to sponsoring parties or coalitions rather than to individual candidates, and it was common practice for the mandates to be distributed out of numerical order. Petrović did not automatically receive a mandate by virtue of his position, but he was nevertheless chosen as a SSJ representative.) He took his seat when the assembly met in early 2001. The SSJ served in opposition in the parliament that followed.

The Federal Republic of Yugoslavia was officially reconstituted as the State Union of Serbia and Montenegro in February 2003, and the Assembly of Serbia and Montenegro was established at the same time. The first members of this body from Serbia were chosen by a form of indirect election from existing parliamentary groups in the National Assembly, with each group allowed representation proportional to its numbers. Only sitting members of the Serbian assembly or the Montenegrin assembly, or members of the Federal Assembly of Yugoslavia at the time of the country's reconstitution, were eligible to serve. The SSJ was allowed five members in the federal assembly, and Petrović was included in the party's delegation. He continued to serve in the National Assembly following his appointment.

The SSJ contested the 2003 Serbian parliamentary election at the head of a coalition called For National Unity, which consisted largely of the same parties that had made up its alliance in 2000. Petrović received the 163rd position on its list, which was mostly arranged in alphabetical order. The list failed to cross the electoral threshold, and Petrović stood down from both his mandates (republic and federal) when the new assembly delegations met in early 2004.

United Serbia
The Party of Serbian Unity split in February 2004, with Marković and Petrović leading a breakaway group called United Serbia. This party contested the 2007 parliamentary election as a junior partner on a coalition list led by the Democratic Party of Serbia and New Serbia; Petrović was included on the list in the 199th position. The list won forty-seven seats, and Petrović subsequently became one of two United Serbia candidates to be awarded a mandate. The party offered outside support to Vojislav Koštunica's administration, and Petrović served as part of the government's parliamentary majority.

United Serbia contested the 2008 parliamentary election as part of an alliance led by the Socialist Party of Serbia, and Petrović received the tenth position on their electoral list. The list won twenty seats, and he was once again awarded a mandate. The 2008 election did not initially produce a clear winner. The Socialist Party ultimately formed a new coalition government with the For a European Serbia alliance led by the Democratic Party. Notwithstanding its origins in Serbian nationalist politics, United Serbia came out early in support of a coalition with the Democratic Party; this is believed to have influenced the Socialist Party's decision. Shortly before the new government's formation, Petrović was quoted as saying that a "pro-European government of Serbia will be formed very quickly and conditions and the economic environment for foreign investments created in that way." United Serbia was not actually included in the new government but provided parliamentary support.

In 2010, Petrović condemned a ruling by the International Criminal Tribunal for the former Yugoslavia (ITCY) which stated that two Bosnian Serb soldiers had displayed genocidal intent in the Srebrenica massacre. He said, "The verdict just further strengthens JS's conviction that the ICTY is not a court in the true sense of the word, but [...] the extended arm of those powerful individuals who have decided to convict Serbs and the Serbian people for something they did not do." He was also quoted as saying, "There was no genocide in Srebrenica ... There were crimes and those who committed them should be held responsible."

Serbia's electoral system was reformed in 2011, such that parliamentary mandates were awarded in numerical order to candidates on successful lists. United Serbia continued its alliance with the Socialist Party; Petrović received the twentieth position on their list and was re-elected when the Socialist-led alliance won forty-four mandates. The Socialists formed a new coalition government with the Serbian Progressive Party after the election, and United Serbia again provided support for the government in the assembly. Petrović was promoted to the fourteenth position on the Socialist-led list in the 2014 election and was re-elected when the list again won forty-four mandates.

In early 2015, the International Court of Justice dismissed mutual claims of genocide by Serbia and Croatia against one another in the context of the 1991–95 war. Shortly before the ruling, Petrović predicted that Serbia would be acquitted while Croatia would be convicted of at least the expulsion of Krajina Serbs in the context of Operation Storm. He was also quoted as saying, "However, we should not look back to the past. We in JS support the view of our government that we should not forget, but forgive certain things from the past, look to the future and establish good political and economic relations with Croatia as our neighbour."

Petrović received the seventh position on the Socialist-led list in the 2016 election and was re-elected to a sixth term when the list won twenty-nine mandates. The Socialists have remained in government with the Progressives throughout this time, and United Serbia has continued to provide parliamentary support.

Petrović is currently the chair of the assembly's committee on the judiciary, public administration, and local self-government; a member of the committee on constitutional and legislative issues and the committee on administrative, budgetary, mandate, and immunity issues; and a member of the parliamentary friendship groups with Austria, Brazil, China, and Italy.

Petrović also served as deputy mayor of Jagodina from 2008 to 2011, when he resigned from the role to continue serving as a deputy.

References

1951 births
Living people
People from Loćika (Rekovac)
Politicians from Jagodina
Members of the National Assembly (Serbia)
Members of the Assembly of Serbia and Montenegro
Party of Serbian Unity politicians
United Serbia politicians